Kilegrend is a village in Fyresdal Municipality in Vestfold og Telemark county, Norway. The village lies in the far southern part of the municipality, near the border with Nissedal Municipality. There was a school in Kilegrend until the 1990s when it was closed.

References

Fyresdal
Villages in Vestfold og Telemark